Ramesh Dulichandbhai Mehta  (born 1947) is an Indian-born British paediatrician at Bedford Hospital, and president of the British Association of Physicians of Indian Origin (BAPIO), in the United Kingdom.

Early life and education

Ramesh Mehta was born in 1947 in a village in central India. From the age of seven, he aspired to become a doctor. Prior to immigrating to the United Kingdom in 1981, he undertook his undergraduate training at the Government Medical College and Hospital, Nagpur, where he completed his postgraduate paediatrics training. He then completed his higher specialist training in the UK, obtained Fellowship of the Royal College of Paediatrics & Child Health.

Clinical career

He was appointed consultant paediatrician at Bedford Hospital in 1993. He then became clinical director of the paediatric directorate and supported the design of the mother and baby unit. He developed children's rheumatology services, prior to joining as honorary consultant in paediatric rheumatology at Great Ormond Street Hospital. He was a tutor at the University of Cambridge and at the Royal College of Paediatrics and Child Health (RCPCH), of which he was its council member and a negotiator between the Indian Academy of Paediatrics and RCPCH.

Equality, diversity and inclusion

In 1996, he founded the British Association of Physicians of Indian Origin (BAPIO), and was its president in 2015, when BAPIO lost the landmark case against the Royal College of General Practitioners, a judgement that Judge Justice Mitting called a ‘moral victory’. He is secretary general of the Global Association of Physicians of Indian Origin (GAPIO).

He has been working on eradicating differential attainment for doctors from Black and minority ethnic backgrounds and international medical graduates, who make up over a third of the UK medical doctors. He inspired the seminal work - Bridging the Gap  in 2021, which produced 10 consensus recommendations for the tackling bias in the full spectrum of medical careers. He has worked on improving workforce recruitment and retention through his project on establishing the Dignity Charter for the NHS which was launched at the Royal College of Surgeons by Sir Stephen Powis in October 2022. As a champion of international medical graduates and locally employed doctors, Ramesh Mehta led the Charter for Locally Employed Doctors which was launched at the first ever conference for Locally Employed Doctors in the UK in summer of 2022.

Honours

Mehta was appointed Officer of the Order of the British Empire (OBE) in 2017 for services to healthcare and Commander of the Order of the British Empire (CBE) in the 2023 New Year Honours for services to equality, diversity and inclusion.

Charity work

In 2020, during the COVID-19 pandemic in the UK, Mehta wrote to the UK home secretary requesting that international medical professionals be exempt from the Health and Care Worker visa, also known as the 'NHS visa'. The following year, during the COVID-19 pandemic in India, he announced an online support plan by doctors of Indian origin living in the UK to help in remote towns and villages in India, including free online evaluations of X-Rays and CT scans. In addition they would raise funds for oxygen concentrators.

Selected publications
 (Co-author)
 (Co-author)
 (Co-author)
 (Co-author)

References

External links

1947 births
Living people
Indian paediatricians
Academics of the University of Cambridge
Physicians of Great Ormond Street Hospital
Place of birth missing (living people)
British paediatricians
Indian emigrants to England
Naturalised citizens of the United Kingdom
Commanders of the Order of the British Empire